Mangapet is a village and mandal in Mulugu district of Telangana and Managapet shiva temple famous and here temple faces west side.

References 

Villages in Mulugu district
Mandals in Mulugu district